This is a list of seasons completed by the Pittsburgh Power. The Power are a professional arena football franchise of the Arena Football League (AFL), based in Pittsburgh, Pennsylvania, and plays its home games at Consol Energy Center. The team was established in 2011. In , the Power had their first winning season as well as their first playoff berth. However, they were eliminated in the conference semifinals.

References
General
 

Arena Football League seasons by team
Pittsburgh-related lists
Pennsylvania sports-related lists